Randy Garber may refer to:

 Randy Garber (soccer) (born 1952), American soccer midfielder
 Randy Garber (politician) (born 1951), member of the Kansas House of Representatives